Elsie Kay Hallahan  (born 4 November 1941), commonly known as Kay Hallahan, is a former deputy leader of the Western Australian branch of the Australian Labor Party.

As a member of the Labor Party, she also served as a minister in the Burke, Dowding and Lawrence ministries in Western Australia, and was the first woman ever to sit in both the Western Australian Legislative Assembly and the Western Australian Legislative Council.

She joined the Western Australian Police in 1969 before moving into social work in 1981.  Her social work career included working at the Western Australian Alcohol and Drug Authority.

At the 1983 election, she won one of the South-East Metropolitan Province seats in the Western Australian Legislative Council. Following the 1986 election, she became a minister in the Burke Ministry, with the portfolios of Community Services, the Family, Youth, the Aged and Women's Interests, and served in similar roles in the Dowding Ministry.
At the 1989 election, with the transition of the Legislative Council to a proportional system of election, she transferred to the East Metropolitan Region. With Carmen Lawrence's rise to premier in February 1990, a significant reshuffle saw Hallahan become Minister for Planning, Lands, Heritage and the Arts. On 5 February 1991 she became Minister for Education.

At the 1993 election, she moved to the Legislative Assembly, successfully contesting the seat of Armadale and in doing so replacing Bob Pearce whose career had effectively been ended by the WA Inc royal commission. She served as Deputy Opposition Leader from February 1993 until October 1994. She retired from parliament at the 1996 election, being succeeded by Alannah MacTiernan (who had also succeeded her in the East Metropolitan seat in the Council in 1993).

In 2002, she was made an Officer of the Order of Australia (AO) for "service to the community, particularly as an advocate for the needs of children, women and the elderly, in matters of social justice, and to the Parliament of Western Australia." She also became chairperson of Save The Children Australia. At the 2004 federal election, following the death of one preselected candidate and the resignation of her replacement, Hallahan nominated to run for Liberal-held Division of Canning, which included Armadale, but was defeated. Ironically Alannah MacTiernan, who had succeeded Hallahan in her Legislative Council and then Legislative Assembly seats, also stood for the ALP in Canning at the 2010 election but she too was unsuccessful. However unlike Hallahan, MacTiernan eventually found her way to Federal Parliament when she won the seat of Perth at the 2013 election.

References

|-

1941 births
Living people
Members of the Western Australian Legislative Assembly
Members of the Western Australian Legislative Council
Politicians from Perth, Western Australia
Officers of the Order of Australia
Recipients of the Centenary Medal
Australian Labor Party members of the Parliament of Western Australia
Women members of the Western Australian Legislative Assembly
Women members of the Western Australian Legislative Council